The 2024 United States House of Representatives elections in West Virginia will be held on November 5, 2024, to elect the two U.S. representatives from the State of West Virginia, one from each of the state's two congressional districts. The elections will coincide with the 2024 U.S. presidential election, as well as other elections to the House of Representatives, elections to the United States Senate, and various state and local elections.

District 1

The 1st district encompasses Southern West Virginia, taking in Huntington, Charleston, Bluefield, Princeton and Beckley. The incumbent is Republican Carol Miller, who was re-elected with 66.7% of the vote in 2022.

Republican primary

Candidates

Declared
Derrick Evans, former state delegate (2020–2021), convicted felon, and participant in the January 6 Capitol attack

Potential
Carol Miller, incumbent U.S. Representative (2019–present)

General election

Predictions

District 2

The 2nd district encompasses the industrial areas of the northern Panhandle including Wheeling, Fairmont, Clarksburg, Morgantown and Parkersburg, as well as the eastern Panhandle. The incumbent is Republican Alex Mooney, who was re-elected with 65.6% of the vote in 2022. Mooney is retiring to run for U.S. Senate.

Republican primary

Candidates

Declared
Alexander Gaaserud, third-party logistics executive
Riley Moore, West Virginia State Treasurer (2021–present)

Filed Paperwork
Joseph Frederick Earley
Heather Rosen-Turley, physician and addiction recovery center owner

Publicly expressed interest
Patrick Morrisey, West Virginia Attorney General (2013–present) and nominee for U.S. Senate in 2018 (decision expected by April 2023)

Declined
Alex Mooney, incumbent U.S. Representative (2015–present) (running for U.S. Senate; endorsed Moore)

Endorsements

General election

Predictions

References

External links

Official campaign websites for 2nd district candidates
Alex Gasserud (R) for Congress
Riley Moore (R) for Congress

2024
West Virginia
United States House of Representatives